Kilimanjaro International Airport (KIA)  is an international airport located in Hai District, Kilimanjaro Region, Tanzania. The airport serves the cities of Arusha and Moshi. The airport handled 802,731 passengers in 2014 and mainly serves regional flights as well as a few long-haul services due to its importance as a leisure destination. It is the largest airport in northern Tanzania, by size and passenger volume.

Overview

Many international visitors also go to national parks in Tanzania, to the Indian Ocean coast, to islands such as Zanzibar, and to Lake Victoria, reflected in the routes of connecting flights. Despite its small size, the airport can handle aircraft as large as Boeing 747s and Antonov 124s. The airport served 665,147 passengers in 2012, a 3.7 percent increase over 2011. The airport served 802,731 passengers in 2014, of whom 45 percent were international, 38 percent domestic, and 17 percent transit.

On 19 February 2014, the governments of Tanzania and the Netherlands signed a grant arrangement to rehabilitate the airport, including its aprons, taxiways, and terminal building. The total cost of the project is expected to be €35.5 million, with €15.0 million funded by the Netherlands and the remainder by Tanzania. The already completed design phase was financed entirely by the Dutch government. In November 2015, renovations began at the airport, aimed at doubling its capacity from the current 600,000 passengers to 1.2 million annually. The renovation work is being done by BAM International, at a cost of US$39.7 million. Renovations were expected to last until May 2017. BAM International is a subsidiary of the Royal BAM Group in the Netherlands.

History
Kilimanjaro Airport opened on 2 December 1971 and cost US$13 million to build. The construction was financed by a long-term loan from the Italian government. In 1998, it became the first international airport in Africa to be privatised and is operated by the Kilimanjaro Airport Development Company. The airport facilitates the tourism industry for visitors travelling to three Regions: Arusha Region, Kilimanjaro Region, Mara Region and Manyara Region. These three regions are home to Mount Kilimanjaro National Park, Arusha National Park, Tarangire National Park, Lake Manyara National Park, the Ngorongoro Conservation Area, Serengeti National Park, and elsewhere. The airport bills itself as the "Gateway to Africa's Wildlife Heritage".

Airlines and destinations

The following airlines maintain regular, scheduled passenger and cargo service to and from Kilimanjaro International Airport.

Notes:
: KLM's outbound flights from Kilimanjaro to Amsterdam make a stop in Dar es Salaam. However, the airline does not have traffic rights to transport passengers solely between Kilimanjaro and Dar es Salaam.
: Qatar Airways' outbound flights from Kilimanjaro to Doha make a stop in Dar es Salaam. However, the airline does not have traffic rights to transport passengers solely between Kilimanjaro and Dar es Salaam.
: Turkish Airlines' inbound flights from Istanbul to Kilimanjaro make a stop in Zanzibar. However, the airline does not have traffic rights to transport passengers solely between Zanzibar and Kilimanjaro.

References

External links

Official website

Airports in Tanzania
Buildings and structures in the Kilimanjaro Region